Death in Paradise is a British–French crime comedy drama television series created by Robert Thorogood, starring Ben Miller (series 1–2), Kris Marshall (series 3–6), Ardal O'Hanlon (series 6–9) and Ralf Little (series 9–). 

The programme is filmed on the French Caribbean island of Guadeloupe and is broadcast on BBC One in the United Kingdom, France 2 in France, PBS, Ovation and Britbox in the United States and Canada, Prime in New Zealand (with repeats on BBC UKTV), and ABC and 9Gem in Australia.

Death in Paradise has enjoyed high viewing figures and a generally positive critical reception since its debut, leading to repeated renewals. The most recent series, series 12, began broadcasting in the UK on 6 January 2023. The show is commissioned for two more series, ensuing the programme will run until at least 2025.

Synopsis

Detective Inspector Richard Poole (Ben Miller) is sent from the Metropolitan Police in London to investigate the murder of a British police officer on the fictional Caribbean island of Saint Marie, a British Overseas Territory with a French colonial history. After he finds the murderer, he is ordered by his supervisors to replace the victim and stay on as the detective inspector (DI) of the island, much to his dismay, solving new cases as they appear and being the object of many fish-out-of-water jokes.

At the start of Series 3, Poole is murdered, and clumsy London detective Humphrey Goodman (Kris Marshall) arrives to investigate the death of his deadpan predecessor. He then stays on the island permanently as the new detective, after his wife informs him she is leaving him. In the second half of Series 6, he resigns so he can start a new life in London with his girlfriend Martha Lloyd, after forming a relationship with her while she was staying at Saint Marie on holiday. Goodman's replacement on Saint Marie is DI Jack Mooney (Ardal O'Hanlon), a recent widower who is grieving the loss of his wife and who assisted the team on a case in London.

Mooney remains on the island until mid-way through Series 9, when he decides he is ready to face the memory of his deceased wife and returns to London with his daughter. His replacement is DI Neville Parker (Ralf Little), who initially dislikes being on the island and has severe allergies, especially with mosquito bites. He initially only comes to the island because they need a British detective to sign off on a case, and is forced to stay longer after a period of illness renders him temporarily unfit to travel. However, he decides to remain on the island and eventually warms to the island lifestyle.

Episodes

Format
While Death in Paradise has continued to be in the top three most popular programmes on British television, critics have called the crime drama "unremarkable" and "an undemanding detective show, with nice Caribbean scenery."

The show is known for its formulaic approach to its plots with each episode roughly the same in length, style and narrative structure. Each episode begins with a pre-credits sequence showing the events leading up to a murder and often the discovery of the body afterwards; this sequence also serves to introduce that particular episode's guest characters. The police force of Saint Marie is subsequently informed of the murder, preliminary investigations and interviews take place to establish the suspects, and photographs of the suspects and crime scene are placed on the whiteboard at police headquarters.

Often towards the end, the lead DI will have a moment of realisation, perhaps brought on by something that someone says or does, or by some occurrence. In this moment, the how, why, and who of the murder are comprehended by the DI, but are not revealed to the audience. The suspects are then gathered and the DI talks through the evidence; often, flashbacks are used to show what happened. The murderer and the motive are revealed in the dénouement of the episode. Gathering the suspects, going through the events and finally identifying, and arresting the murderer is based on the technique Agatha Christie uses in the Miss Marple stories, and some of the Hercule Poirot ones.

Normally, each episode ends with a comedic scene or a celebratory trip by the police officers to Catherine's bar. The final episode of most series has included a subplot wherein the lead DI is tempted to return to the UK by the prospect of a job offer or personal relationship, but in the end, he decides to remain on the island.

This format was subverted in the sixth series, when the two-part storyline in the fifth and sixth episodes saw the team travel to London to follow up on a current case, resulting in Goodman deciding to remain to be with his new girlfriend, Martha; Mooney travelled back to Saint-Marie, initially as a holiday to help escape the memory of his recently deceased wife, but decided to remain as the new detective inspector of the island. This format was also subverted in the ninth series; Mooney decided to return to Britain mid-way through the series as he felt that he was ready to face the memory of his dead wife, with the new inspector (DI Neville Parker) initially coming to the island just to sign off on a particular body but kept for a few weeks for health reasons before he decided to remain to face a new challenge. As of 2023, Parker remains the active DI on the island.

Setting

Saint Marie

Death in Paradise is set on the fictional Caribbean island of Saint Marie, described in Episode 3.3 as a "pretty island" that is "situated in the Eastern Caribbean Sea." In episode 4.5, it is mentioned that Martinique is "a good 70 miles." Saint Marie is a British Overseas Territory, but about 30% of its people are French, due to previous history, with the language still widely spoken.

The back-story appears to be a blend of two real-world islands near to Guadeloupe, with size and location aligning with Marie-Galante and history and language aligning with Dominica. In the TV show, the fictional Saint Marie island has a volcano, rainforest, sugar plantations, a fishing harbour, an airport, a university, a convent, approximately 100 public beaches and a Crown Court. It also has its own newspaper, The Saint Marie Times, and a radio station, Radio Saint Marie. Its vehicles have French number plates.

Honoré, the name of the main town, is a reference to St Honoré, the setting of A Caribbean Mystery by Agatha Christie. The town has a leisure/commercial marina, market, bars and restaurants as well as the police station. The neighbouring town to Honoré is named as Port Royal. Saint Marie's main economic ties are to Guadeloupe, the UK and France. The island's main religions are Catholicism and Voodoo, with several religious festivals featuring in the programme, including the Saint Ursula Festival (in reality, a major festival of the Virgin Islands) and some Voodoo festivals.

Other locations
Episode 3.7 is largely set on an islet just off Saint Marie; it is privately owned and relatively small. It can often be seen in the background from a beach on Saint Marie. Episodes 6.5 and 6.6 are largely set in London, when Goodman, Cassell and Officer Myers form a liaison team with Mooney in order to track down suspects in a murder investigation in Saint Marie and later to investigate the murder of one of the suspects.

Characters

Main
 Ben Miller as DI Richard Poole (Series 1—2; guest Series 3, 10)
 Kris Marshall as DI Humphrey Goodman (Series 3—6)
 Ardal O'Hanlon as DI Jack Mooney (Series 6—9)
 Ralf Little as DI Neville Parker (Series 9—present)
 Sara Martins as DS Camille Bordey (Series 1—4; guest Series 10)
 Joséphine Jobert as Sgt./DS Florence Cassell (Series 4—8, 10—11)
 Aude Legastelois-Bidé as DS Madeleine Dumas (Series 8—9)
 Shantol Jackson as Sgt./DS Naomi Thomas (Series 11—present)
 Danny John-Jules as Officer Dwayne Myers (Series 1—7, guest Series 11)
 Gary Carr as Officer/Sgt. Fidel Best (Series 1—3)
 Tobi Bakare as Officer/Sgt. JP Hooper (Series 4—10)
 Shyko Amos as Officer Ruby Patterson (Series 8—9)
 Tahj Miles as Officer Marlon Pryce (Series 10—present)
 Ginny Holder as Trainee Officer Darlene Curtis (recurring Series 7; Series 11—present)
 Don Warrington as Commissioner Selwyn Patterson (Series 1—present)
 Élizabeth Bourgine as Catherine Bordey (Series 1—present)

Supporting

 Made a voice cameo in this episode.

Danny John-Jules, the longest-tenured actor in the series other than Don Warrington and Elizabeth Bourgine, did not return for series eight and was replaced by Shyko Amos, who plays Commissioner Selwyn Patterson's niece, Ruby. 
John-Jules cited his reason for exiting the show as wanting to "leave on a high". Both Shyko Amos and Aude Legastelois-Bidé left the show at the conclusion of series 9.

Production

The series is filmed on the French island of Guadeloupe in the Lesser Antilles, mainly in the commune of Deshaies (which doubles for the town of Honoré on the fictional island of Saint Marie), with the help of the Bureau d’accueil des tournages de la Région Guadeloupe. The site of the Honoré police station is a church hall in Deshaies (built c.1850s), with the priest's office appearing as the incident room.

Filming series 1 was particularly difficult, due to the lack of infrastructure in Guadeloupe for long-term filming, as well as the fact that Sara Martins, the actress who plays DS Camille Bordey, broke her leg in the middle of filming, causing her to be almost completely written out of Episode 6 of Series 1 and causing difficulties during filming of episodes 7 and 8.

Miller left the series at the start of series 3, as he felt he was spending too much time away from his family, since his wife was unable to join him on the island during production. Marshall's family joined him on the island during his first three six-month shoots and his son, Thomas, enrolled at a local school. When his family were unable to join him during the filming of the sixth series, following the birth of his baby daughter, Elsie, it left him feeling "bereft and empty" and he subsequently decided to leave the show.

From episode 7 of the sixth series, the lead role was taken by Ardal O'Hanlon playing DI Jack Mooney, a London colleague. Joséphine Jobert left the series after episode 6 of the eighth series and was replaced by actress Aude Legastelois, who plays Madeleine Dumas. Jobert cited her reason for exiting the show as wanting to "focus on other projects". O'Hanlon confirmed he had left the show in October 2019, with his last appearance coming in Series 9, Episode 4. His replacement, Ralf Little who plays DI Neville Parker, was revealed the same month.

In July 2020, the BBC announced the departure of Shyko Amos and Legastelois, along with the return of Jobert and the arrival of newcomer Tahj Miles as Marlon Pryce.

In January 2022, in the fourth episode of series 11, Jobert left the show for good after her character left the island. Her departure had not been previously announced.

Reception

Viewing figures
Death in Paradise has gained popularity over time on British TV.

Series 1 (2011) has been the least-watched to date, averaging 5.89 million viewers, with the 5.3 million viewers for the sixth episode, "An Unhelpful Aid", being the lowest the show has had. Each episode was among the top five most-watched programmes of the day and in the top 40 of the week.

Series 2 (2013) averaged 7.67 million viewers, with each episode among the top two most-watched programmes of the day and in the top 15 of the week.

Series 3 (2014) averaged 8.46 million viewers, with each episode among the top two most-watched programmes of the day and in the top ten of the week.

Series 4 (2015) averaged 9.03 million viewers. Based on consolidated figures, each episode was among the top three most-watched programmes of the day and in the top ten of the week.

Series 5 (2016) averaged 8.67 million viewers. Based on consolidated figures, each episode was the most-watched programme of the day and in the top four of the week.

Series 6 (2017) has been the most-watched so far, averaging 9.1 million viewers. The series premiere, "Erupting in Murder", is the most-watched episode of the show to date with 9.81 million viewers. Based on consolidated figures, each episode of Series 6 was the most-watched programme of the day and in the top four of the week.

Series 7 (2018) averaged 8.34 million viewers. Based on consolidated figures, each episode was the most-watched programme of the day and in the top ten of the week.

Series 8 (2019) averaged 8.2 million viewers. Based on consolidated figures, each episode was the most-watched programme of the day and in the top seven of the week.

Series 9 (2020) averaged 8.14 million viewers. Based on consolidated figures, each episode was the most-watched programme of the day and in the top six of the week.

According to a Radio Times article in 2018, "From Australia to Russia to India, stretching across 236 territories, this British crime comedy drama has become a global phenomenon."

Critical response
The series has received mixed reviews from critics, with most criticism directed towards its formulaic structure. The first series was praised for its refreshing style and setting. Kris Marshall's introduction at the start of series 3 was particularly well received, with Rebecca Smith of The Daily Telegraph citing Marshall as a "winning addition" to the cast. The series 4 premiere was described as "a little piece of escapism" and was generally praised. Mark Monahan of The Daily Telegraph criticised the laid-back tone of the series, calling it too methodical with nothing unique about it besides the setting. 

There have also been media comments about colonialism and racism. After the first episode aired in 2011, Metro TV critic Keith Watson wrote that "the idea of parachuting a policeman into a colonial setting because the locals weren't up to the job left a slightly sour taste," and the series resembled a "throwback to the fading glory days of the British Empire". In a January 2021 Guardian essay, writer Sirin Kale pointed out the "large and appreciative audience," but was critical of several aspects, including the racial dynamics: "If Death in Paradise was a dated show when it aired – a throwback to Peter Falk in a trench coat asking just one more thing – it is a museum piece now. For starters, the cast of mostly Black supporting actors call the show’s white, male lead 'Sir', and rely on him to solve crimes that are apparently beyond their wits to work out."

Awards

Red Planet Pictures was nominated for, and won, the "Diversity in a Drama Production Award" for Death in Paradise. Sara Martins, Danny John-Jules, Don Warrington and Tobi Bakare collected the award at a ceremony supported by the BBC and ITV that took place on 15 February 2015.

Broadcast
In the UK, all series are shown on BBC One. The first series was broadcast in late 2011. The second series was broadcast in January 2013, with subsequent series filling the same January slot; all series were shown in a 9:00–10:00 pm slot. 
In France the programme is broadcast on France 2 and France Ô.
Death in Paradise is broadcast in 236 territories. The series is available to stream, as of May 2020, on Britbox. In the USA the programme appears on a number of PBS stations.  The show is also featured on Ovation's "Morning Mysteries" block on Fridays, and also aired on the network every Thursday night back-to-back at 7PM ET. In Germany, the show is now streaming on Disney+ as part of their third-party contract agreement.

Home media

Music

Theme music
The theme music is an instrumental version of a Jamaican song from the 1960s, "You're Wondering Now", written by Coxsone Dodd, originally recorded by Andy & Joey in Jamaica. It was later made famous by The Skatalites and in Europe by ska band The Specials and later still by Amy Winehouse, as featured on some editions of the deluxe version of her album Back to Black. In the final scene of the first episode of the third series, the cover version recorded by The Skatalites in 1994 is played at the bar. It appeared on the official Death in Paradise soundtrack, released in January 2015, alongside other music from all four series. The original version of the song, as recorded by Andy & Joey, was played towards the end of the last episode of the sixth series. It was also recorded by Robert Wyatt on his album Mid-Eighties (1993), under the title "Alfie and Robert Sail Off Into the Sunset", only repeating the lines "You're wondering now / What to do, now you know this is the end". In the French version, the opening song is "Sunday Shining" by Finley Quaye.

The theme music was given a slight overhaul in 2018, when new composer David Michael Celia joined the team and along with Magnus Fiennes, they added more bass to their theme. This theme would only last until 2020. The theme music was given another, bigger overhaul in 2021, with completely new music but still based on the original theme. It was given a new melody and bassline. The composer, Magnus Fiennes, said in an interview that the theme tune needed to be changed for its tenth anniversary. The 2021 Christmas special so the extended version of this theme tune playing over the car with the Carib Rockets, being transported to the Carlton Villa. In the 2022 Christmas Special, the Lyrics were also sung over the theme.

Soundtrack
In January 2015, an official soundtrack compiling 26 songs from the first four series of the show was released by the BBC. It contains original music for Death in Paradise and already extant tunes, though it does not include the theme music from the show.

The soundtrack of the show itself is composed by Magnus Fiennes  and feature musicians such as  the Los Angeles based Reggae band The Lions (Blake Colie on drums, Dave Wilder on bass, Dan Ubick on guitar) and keyboard/melodica player Roger Rivas.

Each detective had their own specific, individual, personalised score based around their personality, Richard Poole had a mournful jazz clarinet,  Humphrey Goodman a bassoon, Jack Mooney mandolin, and DI Neville Parker has gypsy jazz.

Novels
The creator of the show, Robert Thorogood, signed a three-book deal to write Death in Paradise novels featuring the original characters (D.I. Richard Poole, D.S. Camille Bordey, Officer Dwayne Myers, Sergeant Fidel Best and Comm. Selwyn Patterson). The first of these, A Meditation on Murder (A Death in Paradise novel), was published in January 2015. Early reviews were generally favourable, with the Daily Express in particular being complimentary, giving it four stars. The second book, The Killing of Polly Carter, was released in 2016. The third book, Death Knocks Twice, was released in 2017. A fourth book, Murder in the Caribbean, was published in December 2018.

Spin-off series
On 29 June 2022, a spin-off was announced entitled Beyond Paradise, scheduled to begin airing in the UK on 24 February 2023, and will see the return of Kris Marshall as Humphrey Goodman, and Sally Bretton as his girlfriend Martha Lloyd as they enjoy life in Britain. The spin-off was commissioned by BBC One and BritBox International. Filming of the series started in August 2022.

Notes

References

 All ratings are sourced from the Broadcasters' Audience Research Board (BARB).

External links
 
 
 

 
2011 British television series debuts
BBC television dramas
BBC crime television shows
France Télévisions television dramas
France Télévisions crime television series
2010s British crime drama television series
2020s British crime drama television series
British detective television series
French police procedural television series
English-language television shows
Television series set on fictional islands
Television shows set in North America
Television series set in fictional countries
Television shows filmed in Guadeloupe
2010s British mystery television series
2020s British mystery television series
2010s British comedy-drama television series
2020s British comedy-drama television series
Caribbean in fiction